Atayurt is a town in Mersin Province, Turkey

Geography 
Atayurt is in the fertile alluvial plain of Silifke district which itself is a part of Mersin Province. The town is on the D 400 highway. The population is 7154 as of 2012.

History 
The rural population density of the vicinity has always been high and there were two villages (Olukbaşı and Esenbel) next to each other. In 1989, the two villages have been merged to form Atayurt town. In 2005, Karadedeli and Sıtmasuyu villages have been merged.  The name of the town refers to Atatürk, the founder of the Turkish republic.

Economy 
Like other parts of Silifke plain, the main economic activity of Atayurt is agriculture, especially green house and forced crop agriculture. Almost all fruits especially strawberries are produced. Since the sea side is only  to town center, the services to summer houses at the sea side also play a part of town economy.

Concerns about blue tunnel project 
The Göksu River is very important to the economy of the town. The government is planning to use a part of the river to water Central Anatolia with the Blue Tunnel Project referring to a  tunnel with a capacity of 36 m3/s which will drain water to Bağbaşı in Konya Province. Atayurt residents are afraid that this project may cause a partial drought around Atayurt and decrease agricultural production.

References 

Populated places in Mersin Province
Towns in Turkey
Populated places in Silifke District